Carlos Ariel Neumann Torres (born 3 January 1986 in Valenzuela, Paraguay) is a Paraguayan footballer who as of 2021 played for Alianza Universidad in Peru. Neumann broke a record in Bolivian football when scored 23 goals in a single season for San José de Oruro.

Career

Guaraní

2005 season
In the 2005 season, Neumann was in Guaraní's team with national team defenders Aureliano Torres and Julio Manzur, Argentines Hernan Barcos, Hernan Lambert, Valentin Filippini, Matthias Fondato, Paulo Centurion, Hilario Navarro and Juan Fleita, and young players David Mendieta and Julian Benitez.  He also appeared in 1 game for Guaraní in the 2005 Copa Sudamericana.

Choré Central (loan)
In 2006, Neumann played for Choré Central in the División Intermedia, on loan from Guaraní. On 29 April, Neumanm scored a 67th minute penalty for Choré Central in a 2–0 away victory against Sport Colombia. On 28 May, Neumann scored a 59th minute penalty for Choré, the second goal in a 2–1 home victory against Rubio Ñu, after trailing 1–0. On 11 June, he scored in a 2–1 home victory against Sol de America.

Sport Colombia (loan)
On 8 July, Neumann scored his first goals for Sport Colombia, a hat-trick, in a 3–0 home victory against Cerro Porteño PF, noting in the 9th minute, a 35th minute penalty and in the 45th minute. On 6 August, he scored in the 87th minute to equalize the game at 3–3 in a home draw against Rubio Ñu.

3 de Febrero (loan)
Neumann joined Ciudad del Este team 3 de Febrero for the Primera División season, on loan from Guaraní. When on loan, he teamed with defender Wilson Mendez, Argentine Hugo Jazmín and Brazilian Fernando Oliveira.

2007 season
In 2007, he was coached by Carlos Leeb at Guaraní. In the 2007 Guaraní team, Neumann teammated with Jonathan Fabbro.

2009 season
Neumann totalled 4 games for Guaraní in the 2009 Copa Libertadores.

San José
Whilst in Bolivian football, Neumanm had the target of a naturalization to play for Bolivia, and coach Julio Cesar Baldivieso asked of Neumann to achieve the naturalization to play for Bolivia.

Jorge Wilstermann
He appeared in 2 games for Jorge Wilstermann in the 2014 Copa Sudamericana.

The Strongest
He amassed 5 games for The Strongest in the 2016 Copa Libertadores.

Sport Huancayo
In 2017, he signed for 
Sport Huancayo in the Peruvian Primera División, where he has made eighty-seven league appearances and scored forty-three goals.

In November 2020, Neumann was Player of the Week after a Copa Sudamericana game against Uruguayan team Liverpool Montevideo, scoring the second goal in a 2–1 away victory. Neumann entered the field in the 75th minute of the game and scored three minutes later. The game was a historic qualification to the round of 16 phase.

Between 2018 and 2020, Neumann marked 1 goal in 11 games for Sport Huancayo in the Copa Sudamericana competitions.

Personal life
Neumann admires Peru national football team striker Paolo Guerrero. He has a football academy in Huancayo in Peru. He is nicknamed El Tanque, meaning The Tank in Spanish. In 2016, Neumann told Crónica press that at Guaraní, Julio Manzur and German Centurión were the hardest defenders he'd encountered.

References

External links 
 Carlos Neumann "I would like to be a national champion with San José"
 Carlos Neumann: "Sporting Cristal came to do time and back down"
 Neumann: "I had proposals from the big teams in Peru"

1986 births
Living people
Paraguayan footballers
Paraguayan expatriate footballers
Expatriate footballers in Mexico
Expatriate footballers in Bolivia
Expatriate footballers in Peru
Association football forwards
Club Guaraní players
Club Atlético 3 de Febrero players
Club Rubio Ñu footballers
Sport Colombia footballers
Toros Neza footballers
General Caballero Sport Club footballers
Club Real Potosí players
Club San José players
C.D. Jorge Wilstermann players
The Strongest players
Cusco FC footballers
Sport Huancayo footballers